Caenis is a genus of mayflies. They are very small in size, sometimes with a body of only an 1/8 of an inch.

Distribution and ecology
Caenis is one of the most abundant mayfly genera of the Holarctic.  Larvae can occur in high densities on the bottoms of shallow ponds and lakes up to an altitude of 1800 meters in the [Alps].

Densities of 700-1700 larvae per square meter have been reported for C. luctuosa and C. horaria on bottoms covered with organic detritus or decaying leaves. Densities on mineral sediments are an order of magnitude lower (4-330 animals per square meter).

Species
Caenis amica Hagen, 1861
Caenis anceps Traver, 1935
Caenis arwini McCafferty & Davis, 2001
Caenis bajaensis Allen & Murvosh, 1983
Caenis candida Harper & Harper, 1981
Caenis diminuta Walker, 1853
Caenis hilaris (Say, 1839)
Caenis horaria (Linnaeus, 1758)
Caenis latipennis Banks, 1907
Caenis luctuosa (Burmeister, 1839)
Caenis macafferti Provonsha, 1990
Caenis punctata McDunnough, 1931
Caenis tardata McDunnough, 1931
Caenis youngi Roemhild, 1984

Varia
Imitations of this mayfly in hook sizes as small as # 28 are used for fly-fishing. Tying fly imitations this small is difficult, hence the nickname "Anglers Curse."

References

Mayfly genera